Finlay, Texas is a ghost town in Hudspeth County, Texas,  west of Sierra Blanca. The community was named after J.R. Finlay. It had two post offices. One was built in 1890 but never opened. The other was established in 1903. Finlay slowly grew in the early 20th century, but the last population figure was a hundred inhabitants in the 1940s.

References

Ghost towns in West Texas
Geography of Hudspeth County, Texas